Auratonota clasmata is a species of moth of the family Tortricidae. It is found in Brazil.

The wingspan is about 16 mm. The ground colour of the forewings is glossy whitish, suffused pale ochreous medially. The markings are yellowish brown. The hindwings are brownish.

References

Moths described in 2000
Auratonota
Moths of South America